Jesse Ernest Wilkins Jr. (November 27, 1923 – May 1, 2011) was an African American nuclear scientist, mechanical engineer and mathematician.  A child prodigy, he attended the University of Chicago at the age of 13, becoming its youngest ever student. His graduation at a young age resulted in him being hailed as "the Negro Genius" in the national media.

Wilkins and Eugene Wigner co-developed the Wigner-Wilkins approach for estimating the distribution of neutron energies within nuclear reactors, which is the basis for how all nuclear reactors are designed. Wilkins later went on to become the President of the American Nuclear Society in 1974.

Wilkins had a widely varied career, spanning seven decades and including significant contributions to pure and applied mathematics, civil and nuclear engineering, and optics. Wilkins was one of the African American scientists and technicians on the Manhattan Project during the Second World War. He also conducted nuclear physics research in both academia and industry. He wrote numerous scientific papers, served in various important posts, earned several significant awards and helped recruit minority students into the sciences.  During his life he was often the target of racism.

Education and early career 

In 1940, Wilkins completed his AB in mathematics at the University of Chicago. He went on to an MS and PhD in mathematics at the same institution, which he completed in 1941 and 1942. 

Having initially been unable to secure a research position, Wilkins taught mathematics from 1943 to 1944 at the Tuskegee Institute (now Tuskegee University) in Tuskegee, Alabama.

Manhattan Project 
In 1944 he returned to the University of Chicago where he served first as an associate mathematical physicist and then as a physicist in its Metallurgical Laboratory, as part of the Manhattan Project. Working under the direction of Arthur Holly Compton and Enrico Fermi, Wilkins researched the extraction of fissionable nuclear materials, but was not told of the research group's ultimate goal until after the atomic bomb was dropped on Hiroshima. Wilkins was the co-discoverer or discoverer of a number of phenomena in physics such as the Wilkins effect and the Wigner–Wilkins spectra.

When Wilkins's team was about to be transferred to the Oak Ridge National Laboratory in Oak Ridge, Tennessee (known at the time as site "X"), due to the Jim Crow laws of the Southern United States, Wilkins would have been prevented from working there. When Edward Teller was informed about this, he wrote a letter on September 18, 1944, to Harold Urey (who was the director of war research at Columbia at the time) of Wilkins's abilities, informing him about the issue caused by local reactions to Wilkins's race, and recommending his services for a new position. As Teller explained: 

Wilkins then continued to teach mathematics and conduct significant research in neutron absorption with physicist Eugene Wigner, including the development of its mathematical models.  He would also later help design and develop nuclear reactors for electrical power generation, becoming part owner of one such company.

Later career 

To improve communication between mathematicians and nuclear engineers on a project, Wilkins earned  bachelor's (1957) and master's degrees (1960) in mechanical engineering from New York University, thus earning five science degrees during his life. It also qualified him to design and build nuclear facilities.

In 1970 Wilkins went on to serve Howard University as its distinguished professor of applied mathematical physics and also to help found the university's PhD program in mathematics. During his tenure at Howard he undertook a sabbatical position as a visiting scientist at Argonne National Laboratory from 1976 to 1977.

From 1974 to 1975 Wilkins served as president of the American Nuclear Society and in 1976 became the second African American to be elected to the National Academy of Engineering.

From 1990 Wilkins lived and worked in Atlanta, Georgia as a distinguished professor of applied mathematics and mathematical physics at Clark Atlanta University, and retired again for his last time in 2003.

Throughout his years of research Wilkins published more than 100 papers on a variety of subjects, including differential geometry, linear differential equations, integrals, nuclear engineering, gamma radiation shielding and optics, garnering numerous professional and scientific awards along the way.

Family 

Wilkins had two children with his first wife Gloria Louise Steward (d.1980) whom he married in June 1947, married Maxine G. Malone in 1984. He was married a third time to Vera Wood Anderson in Chicago in September 2003. He had a daughter, Sharon, and a son, J. Ernest III, during his first marriage.

His father, J. Ernest Wilkins Sr., served as US Assistant Secretary of Labor during the Eisenhower administration.

Wilkins is the uncle of two notable attorneys: David B. Wilkins, a professor at the Harvard Law School, and Timothy A. Wilkins, a partner with Freshfields Bruckhaus Deringer. In 2010 a niece of Wilkins, Carolyn Marie Wilkins, Professor of Music at the Berklee College of Music in Boston, wrote of Wilkins' father and her family more generally in her biography Damn Near White: An African American Family's Rise from Slavery to Bittersweet Success.

Wilkins died on May 1, 2011 in Fountain Hills, Arizona.  He was buried at the National Memorial Cemetery, Cave Creek, Arizona on May 5.

Tributes and honors 

 The Wilkins effect, plus the Wigner–Wilkins and Wilkins spectra, discovered during the 1940s, are named or co-named after him;
 In March 2007 Wilkins was honored by his alma mater, the University of Chicago, in a special ceremony that included the dedication of his portrait and a plaque in the Eckhart Hall Tea Room of its Physical Sciences Division;
 U.S. Army Outstanding Civilian Service Medal, 1980;
 NAM, Honorary Life Member, Lifetime Achievement Award, 1994;
 QEM Network, Giant in Science Award, 1994;
 Department of Energy, Special Recognition Award, 1996;
 University of Chicago Alumni Association, Professional Achievement Citation, 1997.

Memberships 

Some of Wilkins's memberships included:
 Kappa Alpha Psi fraternity 1938
 National Academy of Engineering, Member, elected in 1976;
 American Society of Mechanical Engineers;
 American Nuclear Society, Board of Directors, 1967–77, President, 1974–75;
 National Research Council of the United States, Advisory Committee on Reactor Safeguards, Chairman, 1990–94;
 Oak Ridge Associated Universities, council, 1990;
 U.S. Army Science Board, chairman, 1970–2001.

Selected writings and other works 

As listed in this work:

Texts
 with Robert L. Hellens and Paul E. Zweifel, "Status of Experimental and Theoretical Information on Neutron Slowing-Down Distributions in Hydrogenous Media," in Proceedings of the International Conference on the Peaceful Uses of Atomic Energy, United Nations, 1956;
 "The Landau Constants," in Progress in Approximation Theory, Nevai, Paul and Allan Pinkus, eds., Academic Press, 1991;
 with E. P. Wigner, Effect of the Temperature of the Moderator on the Velocity Distribution of Neutrons With Numerical Calculations for H as a Moderator, in The Collected Works of Eugene Paul Wigner, Springer-Verlag, 1992;
 "Mean Number of Real Zeroes of a Random Trigonometric Polynomial. II," in Topics in Polynomials of One or Several Variables and Their Applications, World Scientific Publishing, 1993.

Periodicals
 with Herbert Goldstein and L. Volume Spencer, Systematic Calculations of Gamma-Ray Penetration, Physical Review, 1953;
 "The Silverman Necessary Condition for Multiple Integrals in the Calculus of Variations", Proceedings of the American Mathematical Society, 1974;
 "A Variational Problem in Hilbert Space, " Applied Mathematics and Optimization, 1975–76;
 with Keshav N. Srivastava, "Minimum Critical Mass Nuclear Reactors, Part I and Part II", Nuclear Science and Engineering, 1982;
 with J. N. Kibe, "Apodization for Maximum Central Irradiance and Specified Large Rayleigh Limit of Resolution II ", Journal of the Optical Society of America A, Optics and Image Science, 1984;
 "A Modulus of Continuity for a Class of Quasismooth Functions", Proceedings of the American Mathematical Society, 1985;
 "An Asymptotic Expansion for the Expected Number of Real Zeros of a Random Polynomial", Proceedings of the American Mathematical Society, 1988;
 "An Integral Inequality", Proceedings of the American Mathematical Society, 1991;
 with Shantay A. Souter "Mean Number of Real Zeros of a Random Trigonometric Polynomial. III", Journal of Applied Mathematics and Stochastic Analysis, 1995;
 "The Expected Value of the Number of Real Zeros of a Random Sum of Legendre Polynomials", Proceedings of the American Mathematical Society, 1997;
 "Mean Number of Real Zeros of a Random Trigonometric Polynomial IV", Journal of Applied Mathematics and Stochastic Analysis, 1997;
 "Mean Number of Real Zeros of a Random Hyperbolic Polynomial", International Journal of Mathematics and Mathematical Sciences, 2000.

Other work
 "Optimization of Extended Surfaces for Heat Transfer", video recording, American Mathematical Society, 1994.

Biographies
 J. Ernest Wilkins Jr., MAA Online website, November 19, 2003, originally published in the National Association of Mathematicians NAM Newsletter, Fall Issue, 1994;
 J. Ernest Wilkins Jr., Mathematicians of the African Diaspora, State University of New York at Buffalo, November 19, 2003;
 O'Connor, J.J. & Robertson, E. F., Jesse Ernest Wilkins Jr., MacTutor History of Mathematics Archive, April 2002;
 Agwu, Nkechi & Nkwanta, Asamoah, African Americans in Mathematics: DIMACS Workshop, June 26–28, 1996, ed. by Nathaniel Dean, NSF Science and Technology Center in Discrete Mathematics and Theoretical Computer Science,  AMS Bookstore, 1997, ;
 Agwu, Nkechi & Nkwanta, Asamoah, "Dr. J Ernest Wilkins Jr.: The Man and His Works: Mathematician, Physicist and Engineer", Nathaniel Dean, ed., African Americans in Mathematics, (Providence, RI: American Mathematical Society, 1997), pp. 195–205;
 "J. Ernest Wilkins Jr.", Notable Scientists from 1900 to the Present, Gale, 2001.
 Kessler, James H., Kidd, J. S., Kidd, Renée A. & Morin, Katherine A., Distinguished African American Scientists of the 20th Century, Oryx Press, 1996, pp. 331–334, .
 Tubbs, Vincent. "Adjustment of a Genius". Ebony Magazine, February 1958, pp. 60–67.
 Newell, V.K., editor. Black Mathematicians and Their Works, 1980.

See also 
 List of African-American inventors and scientists
 J. Ernest Wilkins Sr., Wilkins' father and the first African American to participate in White House cabinet-level meetings

References

External links 
 
 Part of his early life is retold in the radio drama "Boy With A Dream", a presentation from Destination Freedom

1923 births
2011 deaths
20th-century American mathematicians
African-American engineers
African-American mathematicians
African-American scientists
American Methodists
Clark Atlanta University faculty
University of Chicago alumni
Manhattan Project people
American nuclear physicists
United States Army Science Board people
American mechanical engineers
Polytechnic Institute of New York University alumni
Mathematicians from Illinois
Tuskegee University faculty
Howard University faculty
African-American physicists